Gurëz is a village in the former Fushë Kuqe Commune, Lezhë County, northwestern Albania. At the 2015 local government reform it became part of the municipality Kurbin.

References

Populated places in Kurbin
Villages in Lezhë County